Matthew Flinders' Cat is a 2002 novel by Bryce Courtenay, published by Viking Press. It records the relationship between a homeless former lawyer and alcoholic, and a young skateboard riding boy with a troubled background, who slowly bond over tales of Matthew Flinders and "Trim", the ship's cat who travelled with him on his voyages to circumnavigate Australia.

References
Charles Waterstreet. "Review: Matthew Flinders' Cat" Sydney Morning Herald. January 18 2003

2002 Australian novels
Novels by Bryce Courtenay
Viking Press books